Sitlington is a civil parish in the metropolitan borough of the City of Wakefield, West Yorkshire, England.  The parish contains ten listed buildings that are recorded in the National Heritage List for England.  Of these, two are listed at Grade II*, the middle of the three grades, and the others are at Grade II, the lowest grade.  The parish contains the villages of Middlestown, Netherton, and Overton, and the surrounding countryside.  In the parish is the large house, Netherton Hall, which is listed together with associated structures.  Also in the parish is the former Caphouse Colliery, later the National Coal Mining Museum for England, which contains two listed buildings.  The other listed buildings consist of farm buildings, a wagonway tunnel and its portal, a row of cottages, a milepost, and a church.


Key

Buildings

References

Citations

Sources

 

Lists of listed buildings in West Yorkshire